Burnett is an electoral division of the Legislative Assembly of Queensland in central Queensland, Australia.

It covers most of the coastal region south of Gladstone, as well as coastal and inland regions  completely surrounding the district of Bundaberg. Towns within its boundaries include Miriam Vale, Agnes Water, Rosedale, Bargara, Woodgate and Childers. The Burnett River flows through the electoral district, hence its name.

Members for Burnett

Election results

References

 Waterson, Duncan Bruce: Biographical Register of the Queensland Parliament 1860–1929 (second edition), Sydney 2001.
 Waterson, Duncan Bruce: Biographical register of the Queensland Parliament 1930–1980 w.an outline of Queensland electorates 1859–1980 / D.B. Waterson and John Arnold

External links
 Electorate profile (Antony Green, ABC)

Burnett